The Ellen Badger is a small community NHS hospital located within the town of Shipston-on-Stour in Warwickshire, England. It is operated by South Warwickshire NHS Foundation Trust.

The hospital was built in 1896 to a design by Edward William Mountford. It was endowed by the local wine merchant Richard Badger, and named by him in memory of his wife. The street opposite the Hospital's main frontage is called 'Badgers Crescent'.

Its facilities include a 16 bedded ward with on site physiotherapy, occupational therapy, x-ray, out-patient clinics and a first aid unit. There is a day unit attached to the hospital together with community nursing services.

See also
List of hospitals in England

References

External links

 

Hospitals in Warwickshire
NHS hospitals in England
Shipston-on-Stour
1896 establishments in England